Jena is a historic home in Oxford, Talbot County, Maryland.  It is a -story brick structure with 19th- and 20th-century additions.  It is faced in Flemish bond and distinguished by its first-story 9/6 windows with unusual canted and paneled reveals.

It was listed on the National Register of Historic Places in 1980.

References

External links
, including photo in 1976, at Maryland Historical Trust
Jena, Oxford Road (State Route 333), Oxford vicinity, Talbot, MD at the Historic American Buildings Survey (HABS)

Houses on the National Register of Historic Places in Maryland
Houses in Talbot County, Maryland
Houses completed in 1800
Historic American Buildings Survey in Maryland
National Register of Historic Places in Talbot County, Maryland